Ponnani is a city in Kerala, India. It may also refer to:
 Ponnani Taluk, a Taluka in Kerala
 Ponnani (State Assembly constituency), a constituency in Kerala.
 Ponnani (Lok Sabha constituency), a Lok sabha constituency in Kerala.